McCormack is a family name (surname) that originated in Ireland and Scotland. Spelling variations: Cormack, MacCormack, MacCormac, McCormac, Cormac, Cormach.

Architecture 
 Sir Richard MacCormac, (born 1938), British architect, the founder of MJP Architects

Business 
 Arthur John McCormack (1865–1936), English businessman associated with Wolseley Motors
 Derek McCormack (academic) (f. 1990-2000s), New Zealand professor and administrator of the Auckland University of Technology
 Emmet J. McCormack (1880–1965), US director and treasurer, One of the founders of Moore-McCormack
 Gavan McCormack (f. 1980-2000s), Australian historian and orientalist, visiting Professor of Social Science at the International Christian University in Tokyo

Entertainment
 Adetokumboh McCormack (f. 1990-2000s), Sierra Leone-born US film and television actor
 Ange McCormack (born 1996 or 1997), Australian journalist and radio presenter
 Catherine McCormack (born 1972), English film actress
 Danielle McCormack (f. 1990-2000s), English television actress
 Daryl McCormack (born 1992/1993), Irish actor
 David McCormack (born 1968), Australian singer and songwriter
 Eric McCormack (born 1963), Canadian-born US television, Broadway and film actor
 Franklyn MacCormack (1906–1971), US radio personality
 Geoffrey MacCormack known as Warren Peace, English vocalist
 John McCormack (1884–1945), Irish tenor singer
 Kevin McCormack (born 1970), Irish dancer, one of the first dancers selected for Riverdance
 Mary McCormack (born 1969), US television, Broadway and film actress
 Niamh McCormack (born 2001), Irish actress
 Patty McCormack (born 1945), US film, Broadway and television actress
 Sean McCormack, Academy award nominated sound editor
 Shane McCormack (singer), an Irish contestant in series 7 of The Voice UK (2018)
 Tom McCormack (singer songwriter, producer), recording artist and creator of GLAMA, the Gay Lesbian American Music Awards
 Will McCormack, American actor and younger brother of Mary McCormack

Fictional characters
 Cliff McCormack, fictional character on The CW television series Veronica Mars
 Ren McCormack, fictional character in the film Footloose
 Clive McCormack, fictional character in the video game The Getaway

Law
 Bridget Mary McCormack, Justice of the Michigan Supreme Court (January 1, 2013 – Present)
 Michael McCormack (bc. 1937), US state judge (Nebraska)
 William J. McCormack (f. 1980-1990s), Mauritius-born Canadian Chief of Police
 Mike McCormack, Toronto Police officer and Toronto Police Association president

Literature
 Derek McCormack (f. 1990-2000s), Canadian writer
 Mike McCormack (born 1965), Irish writer
 Una McCormack (born 1972), British-Irish novelist

Medicine
 Henry MacCormac, (1800–1886), Irish physician who advocated open-air theory
 William MacCormac, (1836–1901), British surgeon who served as the President of the Royal College of Surgeons of England.
 Henry MacCormac, Irish dermatologist and physician who served as a lieutenant-colonel in Royal Army Medical Corps during the First World War

Military 
 James McCormack (1910–1975), United States Army officer who served in World War II, and was later the first Director of Military Applications of the United States Atomic Energy Commission

Politics
 Billy McCormack (1928–2012), director and vice president of the Christian Coalition of America and pastor of University Worship Center in Shreveport, Louisiana
 Edward J. McCormack, Jr. (1923–1997), Massachusetts Attorney General, nephew of John William McCormack
 Ellen McCormack (1926–2011), US third-party candidate for US president in 1980
 John McCormac, US politician (Democratic Party)
 John William McCormack (1891–1980), US Representative from Massachusetts and Speaker of the United States House of Representatives
 Michael McCormack (born 1964), Australian Member of Parliament
 Mike McCormack (1921–2020), US Representative from Washington
 Pádraic McCormack (born 1942), Irish delegate to Teachta Dála
 Richard T. McCormack (born 1941), United States Ambassador to the Organization of American States and United States Under Secretary of State for Economic and Agricultural Affairs
 Sean McCormack (f. 1990-2000s), US Assistant Secretary of State
 William McCormack (1879–1947), Australian politician, Premier of Queensland

Sports
 Alan McCormack (born 1984), Irish footballer
 Charlie McCormack (1895–1975), Scottish footballer
 Chris McCormack (triathlete) (born 1973), Australian triathlete
 Damien McCormack (born 1987), Australian rules footballer
 David McCormack (basketball) (born 1999), American basketball player
 Don McCormack (born 1955), American baseball player
 Fergal McCormack (born 1974), Irish hurler and Gaelic footballer
 Frank MacCormack (born 1954), baseball pitcher for Detroit Tigers, Seattle Mariners
 Jack McCormack (rugby league), Australian rugby league footballer
 Jack McCormack (Australian rules footballer), Australian rules footballer
 John McCormack, several sportspeople
 Mark McCormack (1930–2003), American lawyer, sports agent and writer, founder and chairman of IMG
 Mike McCormack (American football) (1930–2013), American football player (Cleveland Browns) and coach
 Ross McCormack (born 1986), Scottish footballer
 Steve McCormack (bc. 1973), Scottish rugby league coach
 Tom McCormack (Erin's Own hurler)  (1888–1959), Irish hurler for Kilkenny and Erin's Own

Other genre
 Billy McCormack (1928–2012), American clergyman
 Bruce L. McCormack (born 1952), professor of theology at Princeton Theological Seminary
 Franklyn MacCormack (1906–1971), US radio personality in Chicago
 Sir William MacCormac, 1st Baronet (1836–1901), British surgeon

Other
 MacCormack method, a discretization scheme for the numerical solution of partial differential equations. It is introduced by Robert W. MacCormack in 1969.
 McCormack Motorsports, former Indy Racing League team owned by Dennis McCormack that operated from 1996 to 2001.
 McCormack, Minnesota, an unorganized territory in St. Louis County, Minnesota

See also
 McCormac
 Carmack
 Cormac
 Cormack (surname)
 Cromack
 McCormick (surname)

References

Anglicised Irish-language surnames
Anglicised Scottish Gaelic-language surnames
Patronymic surnames
Surnames from given names